Acrocercops antimima is a moth of the family Gracillariidae. It is known from New South Wales, Australia.

The larvae feed on Lomatia myricoides. They mine the leaves of their host plant. The mine consists of a large, brown, blotch mine on the upper surface of the leaf.

References

antimima
Moths of Australia
Moths described in 1940